"Sunday" is a mid-tempo alternative song taken from The Cranberries debut album, Everybody Else Is Doing It, So Why Can't We?. It was released as a promotion single in the USA in 1993, before Island Records decided to opt for a re-release the band's first two European singles, "Dreams" and "Linger" in 1994. No video was recorded for this single and the song did not chart.

Track list 
Promo single (USA)
 Sunday (Edit) – 2:15
 Sunday (Album version) – 3:30
 Them – 3:44
"Them" was taken from their 1991 Xeric Records release, Uncertain.

Other releases 
A demo version of "Sunday" was featured on the band's 1990 EP cassette Water Circle.

An acoustic version was released on the KCRW 1995 compilation Rare on Air, volume 2.

A live version of "Sunday" was included on one of the band's "Free to Decide" single. The performance was recorded at The Point, in Dublin (Ireland) on 2 June 1995.

Another live version was featured on the band's live compilation Bualadh Bos released in 2010. The performance was recorded at Pine Knob in Clarkston, MI on 18 August 1996 during the Free to Decide World Tour.

References 

The Cranberries songs
1993 songs
Songs written by Dolores O'Riordan
Songs written by Noel Hogan
Song recordings produced by Stephen Street